The Ministry of Culture of Turkmenistan is a governmental body of Turkmenistan. Its mission is to formulate and implement state cultural policies supporting professional and amateur art, theatre, music, fine arts, cinema, museums, libraries, and written publications, to guard copyright and copyright-related interests, and to protect cultural values.

Ministers

Subordinate Organizations 
 Turkmen State Circus
 State Academy of Arts of Turkmenistan

References 

Culture ministries
Culture